Kyain Sar Pyal Dan Dar Yee is a 2018 Burmese drama television series. It aired on MRTV-4, from September 10 to October 18, 2018, on Mondays to Fridays at 20:45 for 29 episodes.

Cast
Shin Mway La as Thaw Thaw Sit
May Sue Maung as Khoon Cho Kha
Khant as Thoon Cho Thar
Ye Aung as U Khant Htun
Soe Myat Thuzar as Sayama Gyi
Khine Hnin Wai as Daw Cho Cho
Lin Myat as Oakkar
Hsu Htet Hlaing as May Min Myat
Shin Min Set as Jue Jue
Hein Yatu as Ko Thet
Phyo Yazar Naing as Ko Ko Kyaw

References

Burmese television series
MRTV (TV network) original programming